The Atsız Youth are a far-right organization based on the ideology of Nihal Atsız that was founded on May 3, 2005, in Bursa, Turkey.

History 
It was announced that it is forbidden to bring the Flag of Azerbaijan in the Turkey-Armenia football match played in Bursa on October 14, 2009. Four members of the Atsiz Youth were detained by the police for planning to bring model planes with Azerbaijani flags into the stadium in the middle of the match.

The Atsiz Youth, who participated in 2012 Taksim Square rally, on the anniversary of the Khojaly massacre, chanted and held banners that said "You are all Armenians, you are all bastards", and "bastards of Hrant don't scare us", as well as "Taksim Square today, Yerevan tomorrow, we will attack you suddenly at night". The rally was talked about on the media for days. It was stated that the group planned an attack against the BDP, Agos Newspaper and the French Consulate during the rally and also planned to attack the MHP politician Ekmeleddin İhsanoğlu later.

After the Syrian Armed Forces killed 36 Turkish soldiers in Idlib on February 27, 2020, the Atsiz Youth organized an "Army-Nation March" in various provinces.

Bursa is described as the stronghold of the Atsiz Youth. In Mevlutcan Kaplan's nationalist hit song "Teşkilat Türküsü" released in 2020, the Atsiz Youth are mentioned. The second verse says "Turan'dır yurdumuz, Genç Atsızlar ordumuz, Ulusun kurdumuz, Dağlardan dağlara", translating to "Turan is our home, the Atsiz Youth is our army, may our wolf keep howling, from mountains to mountains."

See also 

 Grey Wolves

References 

Pan-Turkist organizations
Turkish nationalist organizations
2005 establishments in Turkey
Anti-Armenianism in Europe
Anti-Armenianism in Turkey
Anti-Greek sentiment
Anti-Kurdish sentiment
Anti-Iranian sentiments
Deniers of the Armenian genocide
Far-right politics in Asia
Far-right politics in Europe
Far-right politics in Turkey
Nationalist movements in Asia
Nationalist movements in Europe
Organizations established in 2005